Khvordeh Bolagh (also Romanized as Khvordeh Bolāgh; also known as Hardabulāq, Kharda-Bulakh, Khordeh Bālā, and Khordeh Bolāgh) is a village in Kaghazkonan-e Shomali Rural District, Kaghazkonan District, Meyaneh County, East Azerbaijan Province, Iran. At the 2006 census, its population was 301, in 82 families.

References 

Populated places in Meyaneh County